Oskar von Büren (born 27 March 1933) is a Swiss cyclist. He competed in the 4,000 metres team pursuit event at the 1952 Summer Olympics.

References

1933 births
Living people
Swiss male cyclists
Olympic cyclists of Switzerland
Cyclists at the 1952 Summer Olympics
Cyclists from Zürich